Le Secret (French for "The Secret") is an EP by French band Alcest, released in May 2005 through Drakkar Productions. It is Alcest's first release with creator Neige as sole member, as former members Aegnor and Argoth both left after the 2001 demo Tristesse Hivernale, and the only release with Neige as sole performer.

The lyrics to the track "Élévation" come from the eponymous poem by Charles Baudelaire's from his 1857 volume of poetry Les Fleurs du mal. The album was re-recorded and re-released in 2011, with the involvement of new member Winterhalter.

Track listing

Reissue track listing

Critical reception 
Although the original release received little to no attention from critics, the 2011 re-recorded version of the EP received positive reviews. It received a rating of 4 out of 5 from Allmusic, with the reviewer stating "it remains a very special record, as it lays out in total the first aural manifesto that all the work of Alcest to date was based upon, and shows just how far apart the unit is, in content and form, from other shoegaze metal acts. This is the door to a powerful, poetic, unsettling world of bliss that still challenges the sense of hearing even as it delights".

Personnel 
 Original
 Neige – lead and backing vocals, guitars, bass, keyboards, drums

 2011 version
 Neige – lead and backing vocals, guitar, bass, keyboards
 Winterhalter – drums, percussion

References

2005 debut EPs
Alcest albums
Les Fleurs du mal in popular culture
Musical settings of poems by Charles Baudelaire